The 2011–12 FIS Ski Jumping World Cup was the 33rd World Cup season in ski jumping for men, the 15th official World Cup season in ski flying and the 1st World Cup season for ladies, who previously competed only in the Continental Cup.

The men's World Cup began on 27 November 2011 in Kuusamo, Finland and ended on 18 March 2012 in Planica, Slovenia. The women's World Cup began on 3 December 2011 in Lillehammer, Norway and ended on 9 March 2012 in Oslo, Norway.

The defending men's champion from the previous season was Thomas Morgenstern.

Season titles

Map of world cup hosts 
All 23 locations hosting world cup events for men (18) and ladies (7) in this season. Event in Szczyrk, Schonach and Klingenthal was canceled. Oberstdorf hosted FIS Team Tour and four hills tournament.

 Four Hills Tournament
 FIS Team Tour (Oberstdorf ski flying events included)

Calendar

Men

Ladies

Men's team

Men's standings

Overall

Ladies' standings

Overall

Nations Cup

Achievements

First World Cup career victory
, 17, in her 1st season – the WC 1 in Lillehammer; it also was her first podium
, 20, in his 3rd season – the WC 5 in Harrachov; first podium was 2011–12 WC 2 in Lillehammer
, 24, in her 1st season – the WC 2 in Hinterzarten; it also was her first podium
, 26, in his 11th season – the WC 16 in Sapporo; first podium was 2004–05 WC 12 in Bischofshofen
, 28, in her 1st season – the WC 6 in Hinzenbach; first podium was 2011–12 WC 4 in Val di Fiemme
, 15, in her 1st season – the WC 11 in Zaō; first podium was 2011–12 WC 3 in Hinterzarten

First World Cup podium
, 20, in his 3rd season – no. 2 in the WC 2 in Lillehammer
, 16, in her 1st season – no. 2 in the WC 1 in Lillehammer
, 21, in her 1st season – no. 3 in the WC 1 in Lillehammer
, 24, in his 6th season – no. 3 in the WC 10 in Innsbruck
, 27, in her 1st season – no. 2 in the WC 2 in Hinterzarten
, 22, in her 1st season – no. 3 in the WC 2 in Hinterzarten
, 15, in her 1st season – no. 2 in the WC 3 in Hinterzarten
, 24, in her 1st season – no. 3 in the WC 3 in Hinterzarten
, 28, in her 1st season – no. 2 in the WC 4 in Val di Fiemme
, 27, in her 1st season – no. 3 in the WC 4 in Val di Fiemme
, 24, in her 1st season – no. 3 in the WC 5 in Val di Fiemme
, 18, in her 1st season – no. 3 in the WC 6 in Hinzenbach
, 21, in her 1st season – no. 3 in the WC 9 in Ljubno
, 27, in his 10th season – no. 3 in the WC 23 in Lahti

Victory in this World Cup (in brackets victory for all time)
 , 5 (40) first places
 , 5 (10) first places
 , 4 (4) first places
 , 3 (5) first places
 , 3 (4) first places
 , 2 (5) first places
 , 2 (4) first places
 , 1 (22) first places
 , 1 (1) first place
 , 9 (9) first places
 , 2 (2) first places
 , 1 (1) first place
 , 1 (1) first place

Footnotes

References 

World cup
World cup
FIS Ski Jumping World Cup